The voiced retroflex approximant is a type of consonant used in some languages. The IPA symbol is a turned lowercase letter r with a rightward hook protruding from the lower right of the letter.

The velar bunched approximant found in some varieties of Dutch and American English sounds similar to the retroflex approximant but it has a very different articulation.

Features
]

Features of the voiced retroflex approximant:

Occurrence

See also
 Alveolar approximant
 Retroflex consonant
 R-colored vowel
 Index of phonetics articles

Notes

References

External links
 

Retroflex consonants
Pulmonic consonants
Oral consonants
Central consonants